Niels Juul (April 27, 1859 – December 4, 1929) was a state senator and U.S. Representative from Illinois. He was born and raised in Denmark.

Biography
Juul was born in Randers in Midtjylland, Denmark. Juul attended the public school (realskole) in Randers. He emigrated to the United States and settled in Chicago, Illinois, in 1880. He engaged in the publishing business. He studied law, and graduated from the law department of Lake Forest University in 1898. He was admitted to the bar in 1899 and commenced practice in Chicago.

He was an alternate delegate to 1892 Republican National Convention from Illinois. He served as a member of the Illinois Senate from 1898 to 1914. He served as assistant attorney of the Sanitary District of Chicago from 1907 to 1911. Juul was elected as a Republican from Illinois's 7th congressional district to the Sixty-fifth and Sixty-sixth Congresses (March 4, 1917 - March 3, 1921). He was an unsuccessful candidate for renomination in 1920.

He was appointed by President Warren G. Harding United States Collector of Customs for the Port of Chicago on January 1, 1921, and served until December 31, 1922, when he resigned. He resumed the practice of law until his death at Norwegian American Hospital in Chicago, on December 4, 1929.

Personal life
Niels Juul was married to Hulda E Risberg Juul (1858-1897). They were the parents of three children including Illinois Fighting Illini men's basketball coach Herb Juul. Niels Juul died in 1929 and was interred in Mount Olive Cemetery in Chicago.

References

Further reading
Barone, Michael; McCutcheon, Chuck (2013)  The Almanac of American Politics 2014 (Chicago: University of Chicago Press)

External links

1859 births
1929 deaths
People from Randers
Danish emigrants to the United States
Politicians from Chicago
Republican Party Illinois state senators
Republican Party members of the United States House of Representatives from Illinois
20th-century American politicians
19th-century American politicians
20th-century American lawyers
Illinois lawyers
19th-century American lawyers